Courtland B. Bullard (born September 2, 1978) is a former American football linebacker in the National Football League. He was drafted by the St. Louis Rams in the fifth round of the 2002 NFL Draft. He played college football for the Ohio State Buckeyes.

Professional career

Pre-draft

References

1978 births
Living people
American football linebackers
Ohio State Buckeyes football players
St. Louis Rams players
Miami Southridge Senior High School alumni
Players of American football from Miami